Granby may refer to:

Places

Canada
Port Granby, Ontario
Granby, Quebec
Granby (electoral district), a Quebec electoral district whose territory is identical to that of the city
Challenger de Granby, a tennis tournament

United States
Granby, Connecticut
Granby, Colorado
Granby, Massachusetts, a New England town
Granby (CDP), Massachusetts, the main village in the town
Granby, Missouri
Granby, New York
Granby, South Carolina
Granby, Vermont
Granby Street, a historic commercial corridor in Norfolk, Virginia
Granby Township (disambiguation)

Elsewhere
Granby crater, a meteor crater in Sweden
Granby Four Streets, an area of Toxteth, Liverpool
Granby, Nottinghamshire, England

Schools
Granby High School, Norfolk, Virginia
Granby Memorial High School, Granby, Connecticut
Granby Junior Senior High School, Granby, Massachusetts

Other
2004 Granby, Colorado, bulldozer rampage
The Marquess of Granby (see Duke of Rutland)
Operation Granby, the UK codename for its military operation in the Gulf War
John Manners, Marquess of Granby, the British commander at the Battle of Minden
Granby (novel), by Thomas Henry Lister, published in 1826
Granby Consolidated Mining, Smelting and Power Company, Limited a Canadian mining and smelting company
Granby roll, an amateur wrestling technique
Granby Runestone located in Sweden
Granby (typeface), a font family by Stephenson Blake